Colquencha Municipality is the sixth municipal section of the Aroma Province in the  La Paz Department, Bolivia. Its seat is Colquencha.

See also 
 Chuqi Q'awa
 Qillqatiri
 Q'ara Willk'i

References 

 Instituto Nacional de Estadística de Bolivia

Municipalities of La Paz Department (Bolivia)